The telecommunications industries within the sector of information and communication technology is made up of all telecommunications/telephone companies and internet service providers and plays a crucial role in the evolution of mobile communications and the information society.

Traditional telephone calls continue to be the industry's biggest revenue generator, but thanks to advances in network technology, telecom today is less about voice and increasingly about text (messaging, email) and images (e.g. video streaming). 
High-speed internet access for computer-based data applications such as broadband information services and interactive entertainment is pervasive. Digital subscriber line (DSL) is the main broadband telecom technology. The fastest growth comes from (value-added) services delivered over mobile networks.

Insight Research projected that telecommunications services revenue worldwide would grow from $2.2 trillion in 2015 to $2.4 trillion in 2019.

Market segmentation

Of all the customer markets, residential and small business markets are the toughest. With hundreds of players in the market, competitors rely heavily on price; success rests largely on brand name strength and investment in efficient billing systems. The corporate market remains the industry's favorite. Big corporate customers are concerned mostly about the quality and reliability of their telephone calls and data delivery while being less price-sensitive than residential customers. Multinationals, spend heavily on telecom infrastructure and premium services like high-security private networks and videoconferencing. Network connectivity can also be provided to other telecom companies by wholesaling circuits to heavy network users like internet service providers and large corporations.

Value chain

Global players

Mergers and acquisitions 
Around 24,800 M&A deals have been conducted in the Telecommunication Industry with either the acquirer or the target company coming from the Telecommunications sector. In total over 5.712 bil. USD have been spent on M&A between 1985 and 2018 in this industry. There has only been one big M&A wave around 1999 and 2000. In most other industry there are three waves between 1990 and 2018. Since 1999 deal value shrunk by -90.12% and is expected to stagnate in 2018.

Here is a list of the top 10 Telecommunication deals in history ranked by volume:

Recent developments
The telecommunications sector has seen a large increase in the recent years. Whereas in 2015 there were 3.3 billion active mobile broadband subscriptions worldwide, in 2020 there were around 7.7 billion. This increase was due, in part at least, to the deployment of 4G LTE.

During the COVID-19 pandemic, telecommunications was used to track the spread of COVID-19 and was use by remote workers to conduct business during the COVID-19 lockdowns.

Societies
Telecommunications Industry Association
IEEE Communications Society
:Category:Telecommunications organizations

See also
List of mobile network operators
List of telephone operating companies
Impact of the COVID-19 pandemic on science and technology#Telecommunications
:Category:Telecommunications companies

References

 
Telecommunications economics
Industries (economics)